Khamas or Kamās/ Khamās /Khamāch/ Khamāj / Kamāchi  (கமாச்) (ఖమాస్/కమాచి) is a rāgam in Carnatic music (musical scale of South Indian classical music). It is a janya rāgam (derived scale) from the 28th melakarta scale Harikambhoji. It is a janya scale, as it does not have all the seven swaras (musical notes) in the ascending scale.

It is a scale that evokes Shringara rasa. It is suitable for javali type compositions.

Structure and Lakshana 

Khamas is an asymmetric rāgam that does not contain rishabham in the ascending scale. It is a vakra-shadava-sampurna rāgam (vakra-shadava, meaning 6 notes in ascending scale with zig-zag moves). Its  structure (ascending and descending scale) is as follows:

 : 
 : 

The notes used in this scale are shadjam, antara gandharam, shuddha madhyamam, panchamam, chathusruthi dhaivatam and kaisiki nishadham in ascending scale, with chathusruthi rishabham included in descending scale. For the details of the notations and terms, see swaras in Carnatic music.

Alternate versions
Originally, Khamas was an upanga raga (uses only the notes in the parent scale). Later with the usage in javalis and other later compositions, the bhashanga type of Khamas came into use (using notes external to the scale). Kakali nishadam (N3) is introduced as anya swara (external note) occasionally.

According to Muthuswami Dikshitar school of music, Khamas is a sampurna raga with no zig-zag notes (no vakra usage).

Khamāj (खमाज)  of Hindustani Music closely resembles Khamas raga. The Hindi film song ‘Tere Mere Milan Ki’ from the movie Abhimaan is based on Khamaj.

Popular compositions
There are many compositions set to Khamas rāgam. Here are some popular kritis composed in this ragam.
Mate malaya-dhvaja pandya-sanjate by Muthiah Bhagavatar
Santana-gopala krishnam, shadanane sakalam arpayami and Sarasa Dala Nayana  by Muthuswami Dikshitar
Sujana jeevana and Seethapathe composed by Tyagaraja
Manasa Ramuni Maravakave  by Venkataramana Bhagavatar
Dooru Maduvarene, Mooruthiyanu niliso By Purandara Dasa
Maatada Baradeno By Bangalore Nagarathnamma
Rama jogi mandu, Ivela Nannu brovara and Rama rara  by Bhadrachala Ramadasu
Entaninne by Subbarama Dikshitar
Broche vaarevaru ra and Intha paraakaelanayya by Mysore Vasudevachar, whose use of N3 in his compositions in this raga is particularly noteworthy.
Idathu padam thookki and Rama nama amrutha by Papanasam Sivan
Tham Tham Tham - Thillana by Patnam Subramania Iyer
Dholayam chala Dholayam chala by Annamacharya
Upendram ashrayami santatam by Mysore Vasudevacharya
Shambho mahadeva chandrachuda by Parameswara Bhagavatar
Saraswati sarasa-vani sarasija-bhavunikki-rani by Varadadasar
Sarasa-sama-mukha, palaya mamayi bho shrikanthesha by Swathi Tirunal
Jayati jayati bharata-mata by Mayuram Vishvanatha shastri

Film Compositions

Language:Tamil

Notes

References

Janya ragas